Jim Williams (born 27 July 1984) is a Welsh professional darts player who plays in Professional Darts Corporation (PDC) events.

Career
Williams first ever rose to prominence in October 2012 at the Winmau World Masters in Hull. There he beat four players in the preliminary rounds to reach the main stage, most notably defeating reigning Lakeside World Champion Christian Kist 3–2 in his final match. Once on stage, he beat established campaigners Jan Dekker 3–1 and Ross Montgomery 3–2 to reach the quarter-finals, before losing out to eventual champion Stephen Bunting by 3 sets to 1.

In February 2013, he came closest to winning his first BDO ranking title, beating Jan Dekker and Remco van Eijden to reach the Scottish Open final, before losing 5–4 to Wesley Harms. In April, he made it to the semi-finals of the German Open, beating Paul Jennings and Richie George, but lost to champion Geert De Vos. One week later, he defeated Glen Durrant, Tony Eccles and John Walton to reach the last 4 of the Polish Open, but was beaten by Jeffrey de Graaf. In the Autumn, he lost to Tony O'Shea in the semis of the Romanian Open, and a fourth semi-final placing in 2013 came at the Northern Ireland Open. Add to that three further quarter final results last year and it amounts to a seeding place at Williams' first Lakeside. Williams made his debut at Lakeside in 2014 as the sole Welsh representative in the men's competition, and hoped to emulate countrymen Leighton Rees, Richie Burnett and Mark Webster by becoming BDO World Champion, but lost in the first round to Dave Prins.

In 2015, on the tour, Williams had some successful tournament runs, including a Final at the German Masters, losing out 6–4 to Wesley Harms. A last-8 in his home Welsh Open before eventually losing out to eventual winner Glen Durrant 4–0. Then a semi-final at the Polish Open, losing out to eventual winner Darius Labanauskas. Another final at the England national after defeating World number one Glen Durrant and Berkshire's Jason Heaver in the semi-final, he eventually lost out 6–5 to Cambridgeshire's Dennis Harbour. Another Quarter-Final at Belgian Open where he lost out 4–2 the eventual winner Jeffrey de Graaf. Then his first ranking event title came at the Antwerp Open where he beat Brian Dawson in the quarters Fabian Roosenbrand in the semi-final before defeating Sven Verndock 2–0 in sets to become the 2015 Antwerp Open Champion. Also in 2015, Williams became Welsh individuals champion defeating Wayne Warren 2–0 in sets in the final. He also collected his first Welsh cap in the six nations of darts, and has been called up to represent Wales at the World cup in Turkey. In October, he went on to reach the final of the English classic, defeating Darryl Fitton 5–4 in the semi final before going on to lose 6–2 to good friend Glen Durrant in the final. He then went on to the World Masters in Hull, losing out in the last 32 3 sets to 1 to Darius Labanauskas. He then went on to the Turkish Open, completing the singles and pairs double, winning the pairs with fellow countryman Martin Phillips, and then going on to defeat Phillips in the singles final 6 legs to 5 to become the 2015 Turkish Open Champion.

In 2019, Williams attempted to secure a PDC tour card. After failing to get a tour card, which would have allowed Williams to compete within the Professional Darts Corporation, he told Dartsnews.com: "I am definitely staying with the BDO. I will possibly do a few PDC Challenge Tours but I’m not sure to be honest."
 In 2020, he reached the BDO World Championship final, but lost to Wayne Warren 7 sets to 4. This turned out to be the last ever BDO World Championship final, as the organization went into liquidation later that year. After failing to secure a PDC tour card for both the 2020 and 2021 PDC Pro Tour, Williams finally earned a tour card for the 2022 season by winning the 2021 PDC Challenge Tour, which also earned him a place in both the 2021 Grand Slam of Darts, and the 2022 PDC World Darts Championship.

PDC
Since 2021 he is playing on the Professional Darts Corporation (PDC) circuit. He qualified for his first PDC World Championship after winning the UK Challenge Tour, where he was beaten by Joe Cullen in the last 64. In only his 6th attempt he won a Pro Tour Event in which he beat Ricky Evans in the final 8-6 to pick up £12,000.

World Championship performances

BDO
 2014: First round (lost to Dave Prins 0–3) (sets)
 2016: Second round (lost to Wesley Harms 3–4)
 2017: Second round (lost to Jamie Hughes 1–4)
 2018: Quarter-finals (lost to Glen Durrant 4–5)
 2019: Semi-finals (lost to Glen Durrant 3–6)
 2020: Runner-up (lost to Wayne Warren 4–7)

PDC
 2022: Second round (lost to Joe Cullen 2–3)
 2023: Third round (lost to Gabriel Clemens 3–4)

Career finals

BDO major finals: 3 (1 title, 2 runners-up)

Performance timeline

BDO

PDC

PDC European Tour

References

External links

1984 births
Living people
Welsh darts players
British Darts Organisation players
Professional Darts Corporation current tour card holders
Sportspeople from Cardiff
PDC ranking title winners